David Agema (born February 11, 1949) is a politician from the U.S. state of Michigan. Presently the chairman of the Top Gun Republican political action committee, he is a former member of the Michigan House of Representatives and of the Republican National Committee. Agema, formerly a commercial pilot for American Airlines, is an Air Force Reserve veteran. He currently resides in Grandville, Michigan.

Early life and education
Agema was born in Grand Rapids, Michigan, on February 11, 1949, in an American family of Dutch origin. He received a Bachelor of Arts from Calvin College in 1971 and an M.B.A. from Central Michigan University in 1975. He served as a fighter pilot in the United States Air Force but never served overseas. In 1978, he joined the Air National Guard, retiring as a lieutenant colonel. Agema then worked for American Airlines and later as a business consultant.

Political involvement
Agema is an anti-abortion Republican, who is actively vocal in his opposition to same-sex marriage and civil unions.

Agema served three terms (the constitutional limit) in the Michigan House of Representatives, from 2007 to 2013, representing parts of the Grand Rapids area.  The American Conservative Union gave him a 100% rating.  He was elected at the 2012 Michigan Republican State Convention to the Republican National Committee, defeating incumbent Saul Anuzis. In 2016 he was replaced by Robert Steele.

Political controversies 

In 2013, he faced calls to resign from the Republican National Committee by only 11 members of Chairman Priebus's executive committee after he posted extracts from an article allegedly written by a doctor entitled "Everyone Should Know These Statistics On Homosexuals" which said that homosexuals lived a "filthy lifestyle", were responsible for 50 percent of U.S. murders in certain cities and that many are pedophiles. Agema was rebuked by RNC chairman Reince Priebus, who drew a distinction between Republican policies on gay rights and the language used in Agema's post, adding "all human beings deserve to be treated with dignity and respect." The Republican platform opposes gay marriage.

Later that year, Agema was condemned by Michigan Governor Rick Snyder after saying that homosexuals were in favor of healthcare reform because "some are dying between 30 and 44 years old." Agema posted several statistics on his web page from newer biased sources confirming earlier death.

In addition to his comments about homosexuals, Agema quoted an article written by another in response to Obama's statement that Muslims have a rich fabric in the history of the United States, "Have you ever seen a Muslim do anything that contributes positively to the American way of life?". This was in reference to the lack of historical record of Obama's statement. Muslim Republicans took offense to this and cited contribution from their families and friends. Additionally, his bill to ban foreign law and Sharia Law (ALAC) (passed by several other states) was seen as an attempt to engender paranoia against Muslims. Agema's comments on Muslims, "styled as an open missive to President Obama", led to the resignation in 2015 of a Maine private-academy lacrosse coach who had re-posted them on Facebook.

On December 31, 2014, Agema reposted an article printed by former Congressman and retired Army lieutenant colonel Allen West in his news letter. West stated he had personally observed some of this and that it would seem racists but needed to be addressed. The article was written pseudonymously and ran in the white nationalist magazine American Renaissance, and included sentences by a public defender concerning certain felons with multiple convictions he had to defend  stating certain  "[B]lacks are different by almost any measure to all other people. They cannot reason as well (referring to these felons).  They cannot communicate as well. They cannot control their impulses as well. They are a threat to all who cross their paths, black and non-black alike." Chairman Reince Priebus subsequently called on him to resign his RNC position. He did not resign.

Electoral history

Personal life
He has been married for more than forty five years  to his wife Barb. They have three children and ten grandchildren.

References

External links

1949 births
American people of Dutch descent
Living people
Calvin University alumni
Central Michigan University alumni
American critics of Islam
Republican Party members of the Michigan House of Representatives
United States Air Force officers
People from Grandville, Michigan
Republican National Committee members
Commercial aviators
21st-century American politicians
Military personnel from Michigan